This article is about the architecture features of Banjar people of South Kalimantan, Indonesia. 
There are several types of traditional houses of the Banjarese:
Bubungan Tinggi
Gajah Baliku
Gajah Manyusu
Balai Laki
Balai Bini
Palimbangan
Palimasan (Rumah Gajah)
Anjung Surung (Rumah Cacak Burung)
Tadah Alas
Rumah Lanting
Joglo Gudang
Bangun Gudang

Traditional architecture of religious structures:
Candi Laras
Candi Agung
Masjid Sultan Suriansyah

Bubungan Tinggi

Rumah Bubungan Tinggi or Rumah Banjar or Rumah Ba-anjung is the most iconic type of house in South Kalimantan. In the old kingdom time, this house is the core building in a complex of a palace. This particular house is where the King and his family would reside. 
Since 1850, there are various building around it with their own respective functions.
The name "Bubungan Tinggi" refers to its sharp roof (45 degrees steep).
This type of house became so popular, that people out of the royalty also took interest in building it. Hence, there are houses with this type of architecture all over South Kalimantan, and even crossing the borders of Central Kalimantan and East Kalimantan. This type of house, of course, took more money than the usual house, so it was naturally the house of the rich.

Nowadays most Banjar people have little interest in building Bubungan Tinggi. Beside the fact that it takes a lot of money to build, people nowadays prefer the "modern" type of house.
Its cultural values, however, are still appreciated. It is the main figure in both South Kalimantan and Banjarmasin's coat of arms. Many of the modern governmental buildings are built with its traits.

Gajah Baliku

Rumah Gajah Baliku is the traditional type of house of the Banjar people. In the old kingdom time, Gajah Baliku was a part of the palace complex. This particular style of house was intended for the closest relatives of the ruler.

Gajah Manyusu

Rumah Gajah Manyusu is a type of traditional house of Banjar people in South Kalimantan, Indonesia. In the old kingdom times, this type of house is the house of the nobles ("Pagustian", the ones who bore the title of "Gusti").

Balai Laki

Balai Laki is a type of traditional house of the Banjar people in their homeland South Kalimantan, Indonesia. In the time of the old kingdom, this house was a part of the palace complex. Rumah Balai Laki was the house for officials such as the ministers.

Balai Bini

Balai Bini is a type of traditional house of the Banjar people in their homeland South Kalimantan, Indonesia. In the past kingdom time, this house was a part of the palace complex. Balai Bini was the house of the ladies of the court, such as the princesses and nannies.

Palimbangan

Rumah Palimbangan is a type of traditional house of the Banjar people in their homeland South Kalimantan, Indonesia. In the time of the old kingdom, this house was a part of the palace complex. Palimbangan was the house for high clerics and big merchants.

Palimasan (Rumah Gajah)

Rumah Palimasan is a type of traditional house of the Banjar people in their homeland in South Kalimantan, Indonesia. The feature of this house is its "shield roof". In the old kingdom time, it is a part of the palace complex. Its function in the complex was to be used as a treasury.
You can still see old houses with this style in South Kalimantan, but they are usually not in a very good condition.

Anjung Surung (Rumah Cacak Burung)

Rumah Anjung Surung is a type of traditional house of the Banjar people in their homeland South Kalimantan, Indonesia. This is the type of house of commoners. The shape of this house if seen from above is the shape of a cross(+), that is why it is also known as Rumah Cacak Burung.

Tadah Alas

Traditional house of Banjar people

Rumah Lanting

Rumah Lanting is a type of traditional house of Banjar people in South Kalimantan, Indonesia. The foundation of this house is raft which floats on the rivers of South Kalimantan. This raft is made from big logs of wood.

Joglo Gudang

Rumah Joglo Gudang or Rumah Bulat is a type of traditional house of the Banjar people in their homeland South Kalimantan, Indonesia. This type of house has the roof that is similar to Javanese-style house, Joglo, hence the name. While the name “Gudang”  (which means "storehouse) was given because the lower part of the house is usually used to store things. This feature makes this type of house is the preferred style of the Chinese-ethnicity who lives in South Kalimantan.

Bangun Gudang

Traditional house of Banjar people

See also

Indonesian architecture

 
Architecture in Indonesia
South Kalimantan